P.A.Th.E./P (Greek: Π.Α.Θ.Ε./Π., Πάτρα - Αθήνα - Θεσσαλονίκη - Ειδομένη/Προμαχώνας), which stands for Patras–Athens–Thessaloniki–Idomeni/Promachonas is a higher-speed rail line in Greece which is partly completed and partly under construction. The section between Athens and Thessaloniki is completed and allows a travel time of 3 hours 20 minutes, a reduction of about three hours.

History
Development of a modern rail network for Greece has been a major goal since the 1990s. In 1996, construction of what is currently known as the P.A.Th.E./P. was given the go-ahead. The line, which should have opened by 2004, will link Patras, Athens and Thessaloniki with the neighboring countries Republic of North Macedonia and Bulgaria via the border stations at Idomeni and Promachonas, respectively.

The project has been faced with delays because of construction and finance. Although 2004 should have been the year the modern electrified rail network opened, opening dates were pushed back many times and, currently, 2018 is the deadline. This does not mean that the line is fully under construction. The Domokos to Thessaloniki part opened, although unelectrified, in 2004, and the Athens to Kiato line in 2005 up to Corinth and in 2007 up to Kiato, once again, unelectrified. Both lines where electrified between 2010 and 2011. In 2020, the Kiato–Aigio section opened.

Sections
The line is further split into several sections. These are:

Further proposals
In March 2018, ErgOSE announced the intention to upgrade the closed Patras-Kalamata metre gauge railway to standard gauge, with maximum speed of 160 km/h. This would presumably take place once the Athens-Patras section is opened.

Although still unofficial, these sections may well be constructed in the future. They have no timetable of construction and are not being forwarded yet. Most of them are in the area around Athens.

Rolling stock

Passenger services
Currently, the Rolling Stock used for passenger services on the line varies. Diesel powered trains include the Stadler GTW are in operation around Athens, serving the largely unelectrified network of the city, while MAN 2000 DMUs and OSE Class 520 can be seen at rare occasions. The Class 220 Locomotive alongside railcars currently serves all Intercity and Higher Speed services on the unelectrified sections of the lines, whereas Class 120 Locomotives pull the cars on the electrified sections. Regional and Commuter services on the electrified sections are exclusively operated by Siemens Desiro EMUs. Although the 30 Class 120 Electric locomotives are enough to provide long-distance services on the network, regional rolling stock is going to be needed, since the Desiro trains are not going to be enough. Purchasing new rolling stock is the obvious choice, however, the difficult financial situation, it has also been purposed to convert some if not all Stadler GTWs to electric traction.
Trenitalia, the new owner of TrainOSE, the sole operator of passenger trains in Greece announced in 2017 that new rolling stock, probably Italian, is going to be ordered sometime in the future.

In September 2017, Trenitalia announced that the V250 trains, formerly operated on the Fyra service between Amsterdam, Brussels and Breda may be used for services between Athens and Thessaloniki. However, in August 2018, Trenitalia instead tested Frecciargento class ETR 485 trains to operate on the Athens-Thessaloniki line in 2018–2019.
However, eventually Trenitalia opted for class ETR 470 Frecciabianca trains, converted to operate under  instead of 15 kV 16,7 Hz AC.

It is also possible that Trenitalia may also use Frecciarossa trains for services on the Athens-Thessaloniki line in the future, thus reducing travel time between the two cities to 2.5 hours.

Cargo services
For many years, Class A 501-510 Locomotives built by MLW have been the main traction for freight services in Greece and are probably going to remain for many years. Class 220 Locomotives are frequently seen hauling cargo trains, although they are not as powerful and are optimized for passenger services. The only Electric Locomotive of Greece, the Class 120, is also seen hauling cargo services mainly on the Thessaloniki to Idomeni Line, but it is also optimized for passenger transportation.

References

Railway lines in Greece
Standard gauge railways in Greece